Dutee Wilcox Flint (December 19, 1882 – March 31, 1961) was a Rhode Island state senator and business magnate in the Rhode Island and Connecticut area.

Business career
Flint was primarily invested in the automobile industry, but also owned a number of radio stations (like what is now known as WPRO (AM)), and the Dutee W. Flint Oil Company. By the beginning of the 1930s, however, he was not the owner of many of these assets; the Dutee W. Flint Oil Company was sold to Socony in 1929, WPRO (AM) was sold to Cherry & Webb Broadcasting in 1931. Most importantly, and after the discontinuance of the Model T in 1927, was forced to sell his stock and Ford dealerships, along with most other assets he had in the Ford Motor Company.

References

External links

Rhode Island Radio: Dutee Wilcox Flint - 61 Thrift Power

Rhode Island state senators
20th-century American businesspeople
1882 births
1961 deaths
20th-century American politicians